In molecular biology, mir-786 microRNA is a short RNA molecule. MicroRNAs function to regulate the expression levels of other genes by several mechanisms.

Regulation of defecation 
miR-786 is involved in control of the defecation motor programme, together with miR-240. These two miRNAs are necessary for normal defecation programme rhythmicity, and average cycle time has been found to be increased in miR-24/786 C. elegans. Decreased cycle times have conversely been observed with miR-52 knockout in C. elegans.

See also 
 MicroRNA

References

External links
 

MicroRNA
MicroRNA precursor families